The Iran women's national futsal team represents Iran in international women's futsal, and is controlled by the Iran Football Federation.

Results and fixtures

2023

Players

Current squad
 Farzaneh Tavasoli (captain)

 Nasimeh Gholami (captain)

 Fereshteh Karimi 

 Arezoo Sedghianizadeh

 Zahra Gholizadeh

 Fatemeh Papi

 Fereshteh Khosravi

 Fatemeh Arzhangi

 Roya Kalati

 Mahsa Kamali

 Nastaran Moghimi

 Zahra Lotf Abadi

 Sara Shirbeigi

 Fahimeh Zare'ei

 Leyla Khodabandeloo

 Fatemeh Etedadi
 Zahra Pilevar Gholizadeh

 Mahtab Banaei

 Narjes Karimi Nasab

 Najmeh Karimi Nasab

 Tahereh Mehdipour

Competitive record
*Draws include knockout matches decided on penalty kicks.
**Gold background colour indicates that the tournament was won.
***Red border colour indicates tournament was held on home soil.

 Champions   Runners-up    Third Place    Fourth place

Futsal World Tournament

AFC Women's Futsal Asian Cup

Asian Indoor and Martial Arts Games

West Asian Championship

Central Asian Championship

Women's Islamic Games

See also
Sport in Iran
Futsal in Iran
Women's futsal in Iran
Iran men's national futsal team
Fereshteh Karimi
WAFF

External links
Football Federation Islamic Republic of Iran official website

Asian women's national futsal teams
W
National
2001 establishments in Iran
Women's football in Iran